George Harris (born 6 February 1949) is an Australian former soccer player. Harris played 28 full international matches for Australia and is a member of the Football Australia Hall of Fame.

Playing career
Harris played youth football for Sans Souci before joining St George-Budapest. He played for St George for over a decade, including the first three years of the National Soccer League (NSL).

In 1980, Harris moved to Blacktown City on a free transfer where he played a single season in the NSL.

References

1948 births
Living people
Australian soccer players
Australia international soccer players
National Soccer League (Australia) players
Association football defenders